Bradgate House may refer to:

 Bradgate House (16th century)
 Bradgate House (19th century)